Dong Liqiang (born 20 August 1965 in Liaoning) is a Chinese assistant football coach and a former international player.

As a player he won six league titles and the 1989-90 Asian Club Championship with Liaoning FC before ending his career with Shenzhen Ping'an. While internationally he represented China in the 1988 Asian Cup and 1992 Asian Cup. Since retiring he moved to assistant management and had coached Shenyang, Nanjing Yoyo F.C., Shenzhen Ping'an Kejian, Liaoning FC and Henan Jianye.

Playing career
Dong Liqiang would join the senior team of Liaoning FC in the 1986 season and would be part of the squad that won the Chinese FA Cup that campaign. The following season, he would start to establish himself as a physically strong and fierce defender within the team and went on to win 1987 league title with Liaoning. After an impressive start to his career the Head coach of the Chinese team Gao Fengwen called him into the squad for the 1988 AFC Asian Cup and played him in the semi-final game against South Korea, which China lost 2-1 after extra time. He returned to club football and helped establish Liaoning as the dominant team within Chinese football by winning several further league titles with the club and the 1989-90 Asian Club Championship making them the first Chinese team to win the premier Asian continental championship. Despite his club success his international career would ultimately be mired by his performance within the 1990 FIFA World Cup qualification (AFC) campaign when on the 17 October 1989 match against United Arab Emirates he was responsible for their two late goals, which saw China lose the match 2-1 and ultimately a place within the World Cup. He was eventually able to rectify his mistakes when in the 1992 AFC Asian Cup China faced United Arab Emirates once again and he played in the team that beat them 4-3 in extra time to win the third place match within the tournament. After spending his whole career with Liaoning and nearing the end of his career he would decide to leave his hometown club and joined second tier football club Shenzhen Ping'an in the 1997 league season where he helped guide them to a runners-up spot within their division a promotion to the top tier. He would spend two more seasons with the club as they remained within the division before he retired at the end of the 1999 campaign.

Career statistics

International statistics

Honours
Liaoning FC
 Chinese Jia-A League: 1987, 1988, 1990, 1991, 1992, 1993
 Chinese FA Cup: 1986
 Asian Club Championship: 1989-90

References

External links
Team China Stats

1965 births
Living people
Chinese footballers
Footballers from Liaoning
China international footballers
Liaoning F.C. players
Shenzhen F.C. players
Association football defenders
Association football midfielders